Sore Thumb is the fourth studio album by American rock band Oso Oso, released on March 18, 2022, through Triple Crown Records.

Background
Sore Thumb was envisioned as a way to relieve the pressure of following up on its predecessor; to experiment and have fun without the prospect of it being released. Lilitri spent a month recording with his cousin Tavish Maloney, and reunited with engineer Billy Mannino, whom he'd worked with on The Yunahon Mixtape (2017). Maloney died one month later, which led Lilitri to package the recordings as the next Oso Oso album, as a tribute to his relative: "“The making of this record is a now a memory of a time that I hold closer to my heart than anything," he said.

The album was surprise released on March 18, 2022.

Reception
Pitchfork awarded it its Best New Music tag, with reviewer Arielle Gordon calling it "adventurous": "Knowing that these songs were likely meant to be reworked before their release makes the record seem contoured by imperfections [...] Sore Thumb is Oso Oso when no one’s watching, still casually sincere and effortlessly earnest." Stereogum columnist Chris DeVille viewed it among the best albums of its year, commenting: "[Sore Thumb is] another study in startlingly melodic aching splendor, stripped-down in feel yet loaded with dazzling lyrics and fascinating sounds." Zach Schonfeld at Spin also ranked it among the year's best, writing, "Sore Thumb is considerably looser and more eclectic [than past efforts]."

Track listing

Personnel
Credits adapted from the album's liner notes.

Musicians
Jade Lilitri – vocals, guitar, bass, drums, aux percussion, producer
Tavish Maloney – guitar, aux percussion, vocals on “Carousel”, producer
Billy Mannino – piano, producer, recording engineer
Josh Knowles – violin on “Describe You”

Production
Mike Sapone – mixing engineer
Mike Kalajian – recording engineer
Daniel Maddalone – additional production
Gianni Gambuzza – additional production
Alfred Barzykowski – cover photo

References

External links
 

2022 albums
Triple Crown Records albums